Hiyoshi Tōshō-gū (日吉東照宮) is a Shinto shrine in Ōtsu, Shiga Prefecture, Japan. It enshrines the first Shōgun of the Tokugawa Shogunate, Tokugawa Ieyasu. It was established in 1623. The shrine's annual festival is held on June 1.

See also 
Tōshō-gū
List of Tōshō-gū

External links 
Official website

1623 establishments in Japan
Shinto shrines in Shiga Prefecture
Tōshō-gū